James Patrick Hosty Jr. (August 28, 1924 – June 10, 2011) was an American FBI agent officially assigned by FBI Headquarters to investigate ultra-rightists like members of the KKK and General Edwin Walker along with "his Minutemen in Dallas." Hosty himself said so on page 4 of his book Assignment Oswald (1996).

In June 1962. Lee Harvey Oswald was allowed to return to the United States after his defection to the Soviet Union. He brought with him a wife and his infant daughter, both born in Russia, and FBI agent John Fain was assigned to investigate him. Fain interviewed Oswald twice – once in June 1962 and once in August 1962. After the second interview, Fain along with FBI Headquarters closed the FBI casefile on Oswald. General Edwin Walker was a well-known anti-communist in his day, and all US anti-communists were outraged that a defector to communist Russia would be allowed to return to the Dallas area with a Russian bride. They demanded that the FBI continually investigate Oswald. Yet the FBI casefile was officially closed.

James Hosty tried to re-open the FBI casefile on Oswald several times in the next nine months, but FBI Headquarters, including FBI Assistant Director Alan Belmont, rejected those requests. Belmont admitted this in his Warren Commission testimony. Hosty evidently kept a close eye on Oswald, anyway, through 1962 and 1963, without sanction of FBI Headquarters.

In early November 1963, Hosty made contact with Oswald's wife Marina Oswald in order to interview her about her entry into the United States 17 months previously. Oswald wrote Hosty a hostile note to protest what he considered harassment of Marina. Oswald also had Hosty's name, phone number, and car license plate number in his address book.

Hosty failed to tell the Warren Commission the truth about Oswald's hostile letter because he had destroyed it, allegedly on his superior's orders. His superior, Gordon Shanklin, denied this. Because of this, Hosty attracted speculation as a possible conspirator in several conspiracy theories.

The Warren Commission attorneys often asked how the FBI could either (1) be unaware of the dangers of Lee Harvey Oswald; or (2) be aware of Oswald's danger and yet fail to warn the Secret Service in Washington DC about this threat to JFK in Dallas. J. Edgar Hoover was asked this question numerous times in his own Warren Commission testimony, with ambiguous replies (which fed different JFK conspiracy theories). After those hearings, Hoover transferred Hosty to the FBI's slow-paced Kansas City office until his mandatory retirement in 1979.

Hosty later wrote a memoir about the Kennedy assassination, titled Assignment: Oswald. In this book, Hosty claimed to have stumbled upon secret CIA information proving that Oswald killed JFK in collusion with Soviet consul Valeriy Kostikov. Hosty further claimed that J. Edgar Hoover and all of FBI Headquarters had deliberately prevented Hosty from learning the truth about Kostikov. Hosty, without any official confirmation, alleged that Kostikov was “the KGB's chief assassination expert for the Western hemisphere” (Hosty, 1996, p. 215).

Since Oswald had admittedly met "Kostin" in Mexico City during the final week of September, 1963, Hosty concluded that the Soviets killed JFK with the aid of Lee Harvey Oswald. In this way, James Hosty himself fostered a popular JFK conspiracy theory. It is noteworthy that Hosty's conspiracy theory was basically the same as that posed by General Walker, i.e. a 'Communist Conspiracy.' Hosty's intrigue about Kostikov runs like a thread from the start to the finish of his 1996 book (Hosty, 1996, Index 'V.V. Kostikov').

Biography
Hosty was born on August 28, 1924, in Chicago, Illinois. He was one of seven children of Charlotte Irene and James Patrick Hosty Sr., an executive in a sugar company in Chicago. Hosty served in the United States military during World War II from 1942 to 1946 and graduated from the University of Notre Dame.

He received an unsigned note from Lee Harvey Oswald about two weeks before the Kennedy assassination. The note asked Hosty to stop questioning Oswald's wife. Hosty filed it away. He first met Oswald on November 22, 1963. It was while he was interrogating Oswald on November 22 that he realized that the unsigned note he had received two weeks prior was from Oswald. He said that, on orders from his supervisor, he destroyed the note after Oswald was killed on November 24, 1963. Notes taken down by Hosty during his interrogation of Oswald on November 22, indicate that when Oswald was asked to account for himself at the time of the assassination, he claimed to have "went outside to watch P. Parade"  (referring to the presidential motorcade). The newly discovered Hosty interrogation notes, unearthed at NARA by former British Intelligence agent and JFK researcher, Malcolm Blunt, were recently featured for the first time in the 2020 NHK World-Japan documentary Oswald and JFK - Unsolved Cases, Part II: The Chessmaster (at 35:00 - 36:10).

He retired from the Federal Bureau of Investigation in 1979.

He died of prostate cancer on June 10, 2011, in Kansas City, Missouri.

Portrayal in fiction 
Hosty was portrayed in the 1991 Oliver Stone film JFK as having a central role in a government conspiracy to assassinate Kennedy and frame Oswald. In the 2011 Stephen King novel 11/22/63, Hosty questions the protagonist Jake Epping, a time traveler who has just narrowly prevented Oswald from killing the president. Hosty is suspicious of Epping because of what he knows about Oswald and his investigation by the FBI, but assists Epping in his efforts to quietly disappear, so that he may return to 2011. (The television adaptation has Epping returning to 2016.)

Actor Ron Livingston portrays Hosty in writer and director Peter Landesman's 2013 film Parkland, which recounts the subsequent events that occurred at Dallas' Parkland Hospital on the day JFK was assassinated.

References 

1924 births
2011 deaths
Federal Bureau of Investigation agents
University of Notre Dame alumni
Military personnel from Chicago
People from Kansas City, Missouri
Deaths from prostate cancer
People associated with the assassination of John F. Kennedy
American military personnel of World War II
Deaths from cancer in Missouri